Alex Anthony is best known as the Public Address announcer for Major League Baseball's New York Mets, a position he held from 2004-2017, first at Shea Stadium and then at Citi Field since the Mets moved there in 2009. He has been called the "Voice of the Mets."

Announcing career
Before becoming an announcer for the New York Mets, Anthony was the PA announcer for New York Islanders games at the Nassau Coliseum from 1995-1998. Anthony also announced New York Jets games at Giants Stadium and New Meadowlands Stadium from 2002-2008, while also announcing for the New York Mets. He later became the backup PA announcer for the New York Rangers from 2008-2012 while still continuing to announce for the Mets. In the offseason before the 2018 season, Anthony was fired from the Mets. He returned to the New York Islanders since their move to the Barclays Center in 2015, when then-Islanders PA Announcer Roger Luce was unavailable. He went back to full-time for the Islanders in 2019, as he called every game of the 2019-2020 season, and continued to do so for the Islanders final season at Nassau Coliseum.  and is one of two game day PA announcers for the New York Jets.

He was the announcer for the US Open Tennis Championship in 2002 and 2003.

Anthony served as a PA voice during the 2006 National League Championship Series, the 2013 All-Star Game, and the 2015 World Series.

Childhood
Anthony grew up in Garden City, New York, a largely upper-middle class suburb of New York City.  He came from a Greek-American family, and his father was a furrier.

He was a very good baseball player — going on to play for Adelphi University, but was even more well known in his community for providing play-by-play commentary of neighborhood stickball and softball games.

Other Announcing Work
Apart from in-stadium sports announcing, he also does voice-over work on several radio and television commercials, and video games, such as Grand Theft Auto. Anthony also works as an announcer for harness racing events held at Yonkers Raceway on days when the Mets are not playing.

References

External links
 Video interview

Major League Baseball broadcasters
Radio personalities from New York City
Major League Baseball public address announcers
Place of birth missing (living people)
National Football League public address announcers
Living people
Year of birth missing (living people)